The 2004 NCAA Division I Women's Tennis Championships were the 23rd annual tournaments to determine the national champions of NCAA Division I women's singles, doubles, and team collegiate tennis in the United States.

Stanford defeated UCLA in the team final, 4–1, to claim their thirteenth national title, the Cardinal's fifth title in eight years.

Additionally, Stanford's Amber Liu became the fourth player to repeat as the singles national champion.

Host
This year's tournaments were hosted by the University of Georgia at the Dan Magill Tennis Complex in Athens, Georgia.

The men's and women's NCAA tennis championships would not be held jointly until 2006.

See also
NCAA Division II Tennis Championships (Men, Women)
NCAA Division III Tennis Championships (Men, Women)

References

External links
List of NCAA Women's Tennis Champions

NCAA Division I tennis championships
NCAA Division I Women's Tennis Championships
NCAA Division I Women's Tennis Championships
NCAA Division I Women's Tennis Championships